The 70th San Sebastián International Film Festival took place from 16 to 24 September 2022 in San Sebastián, Gipuzkoa, Spain. The awards were announced on 24 September 2022, with The Kings of the World winning the Golden Shell.

Background 
Partnering with the Málaga Film Festival, the 70th edition will feature 'Spanish Screenings XXL', a beefed up joint version of the 'Spanish Screenings' film market, hitherto showcased at Málaga. In May 2022, French actress Juliette Binoche was revealed to be the protagonist of the film's official poster as well as the recipient of a Donostia honorary career award. In June 2022, Canadian filmmaker David Cronenberg was disclosed as the recipient of another Donostia Award.

The official selection's film Prison 77 will open the festival, screened out of competition. Other than the opener, an initial lineup with some titles from Spain was announced on 15 July 2022. A slate of 12 international main competition works was announced on 2 August.

Jury 
Official selection
 Matías Mosteirín, Argentinian producer (Jury President)
 Antoinette Boulat, French casting director and filmmaker
 Tea Lindeburg, Danish filmmaker
 Rosa Montero, Spanish writer
 Lemohang Jeremiah Mosese, Lesotho filmmaker
 Hlynur Pálmason, Icelandic director

American actress Glenn Close was slated to feature as Jury president, but cancelled her visit in the wake of a "family emergency".

Kutxabank-New Directors Award
 , filmmaker, Romania (Jury President)
 Paolo Moretti, programmer, Italy
 , film critic, Spain
 Selva Almada, writer, Argentina
 Ashmita Guha, filmmaker, India

Horizonte Latinos
 Giovanni Pompili, Italian producer (Jury President)
 Tatiana Huezo, Salvadoran filmmaker
 Júlia Olmo, Spanish film critic

Zabaltegi-Tabakalera Award
 Albertina Carri, Argentine director, screenwriter and producer (Jury President)
 Vanja Kaluđerčić, director of Rotterdam Film Festival
 Manuel Calvo, producer and director

Irizar Award 
 , journalist and writer (Jury President)
 Nerea Kortabitarte, communicator and writer
 Txema Muñoz, programmer

Sections

Official Selection 
The lineup of titles selected for the official selection include:

In competition 
Highlighted title indicates award winner.

Out of competition

Latin Horizons 
The line up of films selected for the Latin Horizons section is as follows:
Highlighted title indicates award winner.

New Directors 
The initial lineup of films selected for the Kutxabank-New Directors section is as follows:
Highlighted title indicates award winner.

Perlak 
A list of films selected for the 'Perlak' lineup is as follows:

Zabaltegi-Tabakalera 
The lineup of films in the Zabaltegi-Tabakalera section is as follows:
Highlighted title indicates award winner.

Velodromo

Made in Spain 
The slate of films selected for screening in the 'Made in Spain' section is as follows:

Awards

Official selection
 Golden Shell: The Kings of the World by Laura Mora
 Special Jury Prize: Runner by Marian Mathias
 Silver Shell for Best Director: Genki Kawamura for A Hundred Flowers
 Silver Shell for Best Leading Performance: Paul Kircher for Winter Boy & Carla Quílez for La maternal
 Silver Shell for Best Supporting Performance: Renata Lerman for The Substitute
 Best Screenplay: Wang Chao & Dong Yun Zhou for A Woman
 Best Cinematography: Manuel Abramovich for Pornomelancholia

Other Official Awards
 Kutxabank-New Directors Award: Spare Keys by Jeanne Aslan, Paul Saintillan
 Special Mention: On Either Sides of the Pond by Parth Saurabh
 Horizontes Award: Tengo sueños eléctricos by Valentina Maurel
 Zabaltegi-Tabakalera Award: Godland by Hlynur Pálmason
 San Sebastian Audience Award: Argentina, 1985 by Santiago Mitre
 San Sebastian Audience Award for Best European Film: The Beasts by Rodrigo Sorogoyen 
 Spanish Cooperation Award: Noise by Natalia Beristáin
 RTVE-Another Look Award: El sastre groc by Isabel Coixet
 Special Mention: Corsage by Marie Kreutzer
 Irizar Basque Film Award: Cork by Mikel Gurrea
 Special Mention: To Books and Women I Sing by María Elorza
 TCM Youth Award: To Books and Women I Sing by María Elorza

Other awards
 Euskadi Basque Country 2030 Agenda Award: Tori and Lokita by Jean-Pierre and Luc Dardenne
 Nest Award: Blue Mountain by Sofía Salinas & Juan David Bohórquez
 Special Mention: Anabase by Benjamin Goubet
 Dunia Ayaso Award: Tobacco Barns by Rocío Mesa
 Special Mention: El sastre groc by Isabel Coixet
 FIPRESCI Award: Cork by Mikel Gurrea
 Feroz Zinemaldia Award: The Kings of the World by Laura Mora
 Euskal Gidoigileen Elkartea Award: Cork by Mikel Gurrea & Francisco Kosterlitz
 Sebastiane Award: Something You Said Last Night by Luis De Filippis
 Lurra Greenpeace Award: Alcarràs by Carla Simón
 SIGNIS Award: The Kings of the World by Laura Mora
 Special Mention: Runner by Marian Mathias

Special Awards
 Donostia Award for Lifetime Achievements: Juliette Binoche and David Cronenberg

References

External links
 

September 2022 events in Spain
San Sebastián International Film Festival
2022 in the Basque Country (autonomous community)
San Sebastian
2022 festivals in Europe